Pascal Chimdindu Anorue (born 8 October 1994) is a Nigerian footballer who most recently played for Ankara 1910 SK in Turkey, where he played as a winger.

Early career 
Chimdindu Anorue began his career at Delta Force Feeders FC and later joined AGNS FC. He  joined ABS F.C. in 2013 where he debuted for them in Nigeria Premier League. In December, 2017,  he was sent on loan to Fatai Dragons FC.

Senior career 
He joined Ankara Metropol SK in January 2020 and had a short loan spell at Ankara 1910 SK in April 2020.

References

External links
 
 Pascal Chimdindu Anorue at Footba11.co
 
 Pascal Chimdindu Anorue at Foot4me

Living people
1994 births
Sportspeople from Delta State
Nigerian footballers
Nigerian expatriate footballers
ABS F.C. players
Association football wingers